The LG LF7700 is an LCD TV with built-in FreeSat-HD. This is the first LG set with built-in FreeSat, following a partnership deal between LG and FreeSat in January 2009. Until then Panasonic were the only brand to offer TVs with built-in FreeSat.  the LF7700 is the only LG product with built-in FreeSat currently on the market; LG hinted that the partnership could be extended to other products.

Features
The television features:
HD Ready 1080p
Twin XD Engine
Intelligent Sensor II
TruMotion 100 Hz (42" / 47")
24p Real Cinema
Dynamic Contrast Ratio: 80,000:1 (42" / 47") 50,000:1 (32" / 37")
Invisible Speaker
3 HDMI 1.3 Deep Colour
USB 2.0 (JPEG/MP3 Playback)
AV mode (game, sport and cinema modes)
Swivel Stand
Energy Saving Trust Recommended (32"/37"/42")
Available in 32"/37"/42"/47"

See also
LG Electronics
LG Display

References

LG Electronics products
Digital television
High-definition television
Television sets